Taymir Burnet (born 1 October 1992) is a Dutch sprinter. He won a bronze medal in the 4 × 100 metres relay at the 2018 European Championships. In addition, he represented his country in the same event at the 2017 World Championships and 2019 World Championships without qualifying for the final.

International competitions

1Disqualified in the final
2Did not finish in the final

Personal bests
Outdoor
100 metres – 10.12 (-0.1 m/s, La Chaux-de-Fonds 2019)
100 metres – 9.98. (+3.5 m/s, La Chaux-de-Fonds 2019)
200 metres – 20.35 (-0.7 m/s, La Chaux-de-Fonds 2019)
Indoor
60 metres – 6.78 (Apeldoorn 2018)

References

1992 births
Living people
Dutch male sprinters
People from Willemstad
Athletes (track and field) at the 2020 Summer Olympics
Olympic athletes of the Netherlands
World Athletics Indoor Championships medalists